Alfred Hagan (10 November 1895 – 1980) was an English professional footballer who played as an inside forward.

Early life
Hagan was born in Usworth and worked at the colliery in the town. He served as a private in the Northumberland Fusiliers during the First World War.

Career
After playing local football for Washington Colliery, Hagan signed for Newcastle United in 1919. He moved to Cardiff City in 1923 but did not make his debut for the club until 26 December of that year, playing in a 3–1 victory over Sheffield United. He remained with the club for three seasons but struggled to break into the first team. He eventually joined Tranmere Rovers in 1926, along with Herbie Evans, where he finished his professional career.

Personal life
Hagan's son Jimmy was also a professional footballer and won a single cap for England in 1948.

References

1895 births
1980 deaths
English footballers
Washington F.C. players
Newcastle United F.C. players
Cardiff City F.C. players
Tranmere Rovers F.C. players
English Football League players
Association football forwards
British Army personnel of World War I
Royal Northumberland Fusiliers soldiers
Military personnel from County Durham